Laptop, also known as My Mother's Laptop, is a 2008 Malayalam film by Rupesh Paul starring Suresh Gopi and Padmapriya. The film is based on a short story titled 'Parudheesa Nashtam' by Subhash Chandran.

Plot 
Ravi is a famous theatre artist. He returns home after thirty long years and finds that his mother is in a coma state following some terminal illness. His guilt feelings and deep regrets of having deserted her forces him to leave his profession and stay at the hospital with his mom. His girlfriend Payal comes from Calcutta to console him and persuade him to return to his profession. But he is adamant.

Cast 
 Suresh Gopi as Ravi
 Shweta Menon as Ravi's mother
 Padmapriya as Payal
 Urmila Unni
 Madhuben
 Harikrishnan Nair S

Soundtrack

Reception 
Rediff.com gave the film a score of 1/5, praising the promising opening of the film, but felt that the movie lost its momentum pretty soon.

References

External links
 sify.com
 http://www.nowrunning.com/movie/5018/malayalam/my-mothers-laptop/index.htm
 
 https://web.archive.org/web/20090907071323/http://www.cinefundas.com/2008/07/30/laptop-malayalam-movie-review
 https://archive.today/20130218010421/http://popcorn.oneindia.in/title/515/laptop.html

2000s Malayalam-language films
2008 films
Films based on short fiction
Films scored by Sreevalsan J. Menon
Films directed by Rupesh Paul